Harry Deal and the Galaxies is a rock and roll band formed in Taylorsville, North Carolina, United States, in 1959. They are most famous for playing a style of music known as beach music, which began in the 1940s in dance clubs of South Carolina beach towns such as Myrtle Beach.

Career
The group was formed by brothers Harry and Jimmy Deal in the small southern town of Taylorsville, NC, where the band continues to perform over 50 years later. The band is synonymous with the term beach music, a style of rock and roll that started in the late 1940s in the dance clubs in the vicinity of Myrtle Beach on the coast of South Carolina. Their music is also associated with a type of dance known as "shagging," or the Carolina Shag. They first made their claim as the "Kings of Beach Music" during the 1960s at the Myrtle Beach Pavilion, which was at one time one of the most popular entertainment spots in the southeastern U.S.A.

After beach music hit its peak in the early 1970s, Harry and the band continued to perform and tour, adapting their music to the sounds of the times, while never leaving their beach roots far behind.  Over the years, the Galaxies have expanded their repertoire to include modern rock and country music, but they continue to be known as pioneers of the beach music style.

The band forged on through the 1980s and 1990s, during which time Harry opened a performance center in his home town of Taylorsville. On in to the 2000s they still perform throughout the Carolinas with their latest lineup of "Galaxies."

Several members of the Deal family have played in the band through the years, including wife Geneva, son David and daughter Donna. Additionally, Harry and his brother Jimmy Deal built Galaxie III Recording Studio in the 1960s, where the band has recorded most of its music.

Death
Harry Deal passed away on December 16th, 2017 in Hickory, North Carolina.

Discography

Singles/45s

 Salty Dog
 Smacky Mouth b/w Sad But True
 I Still Love You b/w You're Always on My Mind
 In Between The Lines b/w 50's Medley
 Miss Grace b/w Stay
 Fonky, Fonky b/w Everything is Everything
 60 Minute Man
 Hey Baby b/w Comin on Slow
 This Love I Have b/w Walrus
 Bad Girl
 Don't You Just Know It
 Warm, Sunny Sunday
 I'm Up for Gettin' Down Tonight  b/w The Little Girl Next Door
 She's Got it All together
 Summer Time Means Beach b/w Comin' On Slow

Albums/LPs

 At the Beach
 Vintage
 United
 I Feel Good All Over
 Harry Deal & the Galaxies
 "A New Day" Eclipse ECS 1002

References

External links
Official website
Harry Deal & the Galaxies section in "Online Guide to Singles"
Reference in History of Beach Music
Comprehensive band history from "The Heeey Baby Days Of Beach Music" by Greg Haynes
Discography on CarolinaSoul.org
History of Harry Deal & the Galaxies on Funky16corners
Reference in History of Beach Music article
Reference in "Shagging in the Carolinas" book on beach music by 'Fessa John Hook
Reference in Beach Music article on wral.com
Harry Deal & the Galaxies reference on Beach Music CD collection
Record review of the Galaxies' 1960s hit "Fonky, Fonky"

Rock music groups from North Carolina
Rock and roll music groups